Peter van Dongen (born 21 October 1966 in Amsterdam) is a Dutch cartoonist. He is the winner of the 2018 Stripschapprijs.

References

Living people
Dutch cartoonists
Winners of the Stripschapsprijs
People from Amsterdam
1966 births
21st-century Dutch male artists